Stiriinae is a subfamily of owlet moths in the family Noctuidae. There are more than 20 genera and 130 described species in Stiriinae.

Stiriinae was formed as a result of phylogenetic research published in 2019, when the tribe Stiriini was determined to be polyphyletic, with much of its diversity spread among three subfamilies. One of the three subfamilies was the existing family Metoponiinae. The other two subfamilies, Grotellinae and Stiriinae, were previously subtribes of Stiriini and were elevated to subfamily rank. Stiriini and Annaphilini are now tribes of the new subfamily Stiriinae, containing the majority of genera from the former subtribes Stiriina and Annaphilina.

Genera
These 21 genera belong to the subfamily Stiriinae:

 Tribe Annaphilini
 Cerathosia Smith, 1887
 Tribe Stiriini Grote, 1882
 Angulostiria Poole, 1995
 Argentostiria Poole, 1995
 Basilodes Guenée, 1852
 Bistica Dyar, 1912
 Chalcopasta Hampson, 1908
 Chrysoecia Hampson, 1908
 Cirrhophanus Grote, 1872
 Cuahtemoca Hogue, 1963
 Eulithosia H. Edwards, 1884
 Hoplolythrodes Poole, 1995
 Lineostriastiria Poole, 1995
 Narthecophora Smith, 1900
 Neumoegenia Grote, 1882
 Plagiomimicus Grote, 1873
 Stiria Grote, 1874
 Xanthothrix H. Edwards, 1878
 Not assigned to a tribe
 Annaphila Grote, 1873
 Fala Grote, 1875
 Fota Grote, 1882
 Stilbia Stephens, 1829

References

 Natural History Museum Lepidoptera genus database

 
Noctuidae